The MV Agusta 125 SOHC, also called the MV Agusta 125 Monoalbero was a motorcycle produced by MV Agusta as a "Catalog" racer for the public in 1953. Privateer racers could purchase this race bike and could be highly competitive with a machine that was very similar to MV Agusta's works built motorcycles. The motorcycle was a considerable success and remained in production until 1956.

Specifications

 Bore Stroke: (4-stroke Single cylinder 53 X 56 - 123.5 cm)
 Compression Ratio: 9.2 : 1
 Ignition: Magnito
 Clutch: Wet, Multi plate
 Carburetors: Dell’ Orto SS 27A
 Wheels: Light Alloy, Wire spoke. Front: 1.75 X 19” Rear: 2.25 X 19”
 Oil Tank capacity: 2 kg.
 Transmission: Geared Primary, Final Drive. Chain
 Valve Configuration: Inclined overhead
 Lubrication: Geared Pressure pump

Fairing
In 1953 many racers adopted the dustbin fairing design on the MV Agusta 125 Bialbero. The dustbin was a very large fairing that was built with air flow in mind. In 1957, the dustbin fairing was abolished due to riders being injured when strong crosswinds literally blew the racers off the track.

See also
List of motorcycles of the 1950s

References

125 Sohc
Motorcycles introduced in the 1950s
Sport bikes
Single-cylinder motorcycles